William Matthews (April 26, 1755 – c. 1808) was an American politician.  He was born in Cecil County, Maryland, and was a judge of the Cecil County Court in 1778, 1780, and 1782–1786.  He was a member of the Maryland House of Delegates from 1786 to 1789.

He was later elected from the sixth district of Maryland as a Federalist to the Fifth Congress, serving from March 4, 1797, to March 3, 1799.  In this position he was both preceded and succeeded by the Democratic-Republican Gabriel Christie.  He is interred in his family's graveyard in Cecil County.

References

1755 births
1808 deaths
Members of the Maryland House of Delegates
Maryland state court judges
People from Cecil County, Maryland
Federalist Party members of the United States House of Representatives from Maryland